Typhoon Over Nagasaki (French: Typhon sur Nagasaki) is a 1957 French-Japanese romantic drama film directed by Yves Ciampi and starring Danielle Darrieux, Jean Marais, Keiko Kishi and Gert Fröbe.

It was shot in Japan in Nagasaki, Hiroshima and Osaka. The film's sets were designed by the art directors Robert Gys and Kisaku Itô.

Plot
Pierre Marsac, a French engineer working at the Nagasaki shipbuilding yards is in love with a young local woman Noriko Sakurai. However, when he encounters a former lover, the journalist Françoise Fabre he drifts apart from Noriko. Tragedy strikes when a typhoon overwhelms the region.

Cast 
 Danielle Darrieux as Françoise Fabre
 Jean Marais as Pierre Marsac
 Keiko Kishi as Noriko Sakurai
 Sō Yamamura as Hori
 Hitomi Nozoe as Saeko Sakurai
 Kumeko Urabe as Fujita
 Gert Fröbe as Ritter
 Shinobu Asaji as Keiko Ritter

References

Bibliography 
 Parish, James Robert. Film Actors Guide: Western Europe. Scarecrow Press, 1977.

External links 
 
 Typhon sur Nagasaki (1957) at the Films de France

1957 films
French romantic drama films
1950s French-language films
French black-and-white films
Films set in Japan
Films directed by Yves Ciampi
1957 romantic drama films
French disaster films
Japan in non-Japanese culture
Pathé films
Shochiku films
1950s French films